Acton is a suburban residential locality in the local government area (LGA) of Burnie in the North-west and west LGA region of Tasmania. The 2021 census recorded a population of 1377 for Acton.

There is a local milk bar, an IGA supermarket, and an Aurora Energy electrical substation.

There is an  reserve at Mussen Close with walking tracks; Stoney Creek commences nearby.

Acton Seniors Club operates in Atkins Drive.

History 
Acton was gazetted as a locality in 1966.

Geography
Shorewell Creek forms much of the western boundary.

Road infrastructure
Route B18 (Mount Street) passes to the east. From there, several streets provide access to the locality.

Education 
The Acton Primary School existed up until 2009, when it was merged with Upper Burnie and Brooklyn Primary Schools and a new school was built on the grounds of the Parklands High School. The old Acton Primary School is now home to the Burnie Child and Family Centre.

Sports 
There are two fields at the Acton Recreation Reserve.

References

Suburbs of Burnie, Tasmania